This is a list of museums in the Province of Varese, Lombardy Region, Italy.

Museums and ecomuseums

References

External links 

 Cultural observatory of Lombardy Region

 
 
Varese
Province of Varese